Kazimierz Klaudiusz Górski (2 March 1921 – 23 May 2006) was a coach of Poland national football team and honorary president of the Polish Football Association. He was also a football player, capped once for Poland.

Playing career
He was born in Lwów, Second Polish Republic (nowadays Lviv, Ukraine). He played as a forward in several Polish football teams: RKS Lwów, Spartak Lviv, FC Dynamo Lviv, Legia Warsaw and his football nickname was "Sarenka" ("Roe-deer"). His successful career was interrupted by World War II and it took until 1948 before he participated in his only international match, a game between Poland and Denmark (0–8).

Team coach in Poland
He graduated in football training from the Higher School of Physical Education in Kraków (Wyższa Szkoła Wychowania Fizycznego, today the Akademia Wychowania Fizycznego w Krakowie) and the Physical Education Academy in Wrocław (Akademia Wychowania Fizycznego we Wrocławiu) in 1980. He was the coach of Legia Warsaw (3 times), Marymont Warszawa (his first independent training job started there in 1954), Gwardia Warszawa, Lublinianka Lublin, and ŁKS Łódź.

Polish national team coach 1970–1976
He started as the coach of the Polish national junior team from 1956 to 1966, then the Polish U-23 national team from 1966 to 1970, and finally the first Poland national football team from 1970 to 1976. His first international match with the team was held on 5 May 1971 in Lausanne against Switzerland. His major successes were winning the gold medal in the 1972 Olympic Games in Munich; the silver medal (for third place) in the 1974 World Cup held in Germany; and another silver medal for second place in the 1976 Olympic Games in Montreal (the second of Poland's three Olympic medals in football). Kazimierz Górski was the coach of the Polish national team for 73 matches (with 45 wins).

Poland qualified for the 1974 World Cup by defeating 1966 World Cup winners England at home and holding them to a draw at Wembley.

Team coach in Greece
After resigning his position with the Polish national team, he went to Greece and was a successful coach with Panathinaikos Athens, Kastoria FC, Olympiakos Piraeus and Ethnikos Piraeus.

PZPN activist
From 1976 Kazimierz Górski was an honorary member of the Polish Football Union (Polski Związek Piłki Nożnej, PZPN).

When he retired from coaching, he became an activist for PZPN in 1986. From 1987 he was a vice-president and from 1991 to 1995 was the president of PZPN. From 3 July 1995 he was the honorary president of PZPN.

He died from cancer following a long illness on 23 May 2006, aged 85, in Warsaw.

Awards and recognition

Honours
 FIFA Order of Merit (2006, posthumously)
 Order of Merit in Ruby – UEFA award (2006, posthumously)
 Gold Medal of Merit – FIFA award (2001)
 Commander's Cross of Polonia Restituta (1996)
 Commander's with Star of Polonia Restituta (2006)
 Grand Cross of Polonia Restituta (2006, posthumous)
 Honorary citizen of Lviv (2003), Plock (2004) and Lubaczów
 Doctor Honoris Causa of the Gdańsk Academy of Physical Education and Sport (Akademia Wychowania Fizycznego i Sportu im. Jędrzeja Śniadeckiego) (24 November 2003)
 Super Victor (24 April 2006)

Other recognition
 A School Sports Championships in Łódź was named after him.
 The Stadion Narodowy is named after him and has a statue honouring him outside it.
 The Płock Municipal Stadium is also named after him.

References

External links
 

1921 births
2006 deaths
1974 FIFA World Cup managers
Sportspeople from Lviv
People from Lwów Voivodeship
Polish football managers
Polish footballers
Polish expatriate footballers
Poland international footballers
Polish expatriate football managers
FC Dynamo Lviv players
Legia Warsaw players
Olympiacos F.C. managers
Panathinaikos F.C. managers
Ethnikos Piraeus F.C. managers
Super League Greece managers
Expatriate football managers in Greece
Grand Crosses of the Order of Polonia Restituta
Poland national football team managers
Legia Warsaw managers
ŁKS Łódź managers
Gwardia Warsaw managers
Deaths from cancer in Poland
Association football forwards